Edward or Eddie Charlton may refer to:

Edward Charleton, 5th Baron Cherleton (1370–1421), 5th and last Baron Cherleton of Powys
Sir Edward Charlton, 1st Baronet (died 1674)–see Charlton baronets
Edward Charlton (historian) (1814–1874), English physician, writer and historian 
Edward Charlton (Royal Navy officer) (1865–1937), Royal Navy officer, Commander-in-Chief, Cape of Good Hope Station
Edward Charlton (British Army officer) (1871–1961), British Army officer
Edward Colquhoun Charlton (1920–1945), British Army soldier and recipient of the Victoria Cross
Eddie Charlton (1929–2004), Australian snooker player
Eddie Charlton (squash player) (born 1988), English squash player

See also
Charlton (surname)